Blainville may refer to:

Places:
Blainville-Crevon in the Seine-Maritime département, Haute-Normandie, France
Blainville-sur-Mer in the Manche département, Basse-Normandie, France
Blainville-sur-Orne in the Calvados département, Basse-Normandie
Blainville, Quebec, a suburb of Montreal, Quebec
Blainville (provincial electoral district), a provincial electoral district in Quebec, Canada
 Blainville (AMT), railway station in Blainville, Quebec

People:
 Henri Marie Ducrotay de Blainville (1777–1850), French zoologist 

Sports:
 A.S. Blainville, a semi-professional soccer club in Quebec, Canada

See also
 Blaineville, Virginia United States